Yenisey Stadium is a demolished outdoor sports venue in Krasnoyarsk, which in December 2018 was reopened as an indoor arena. It is the home of Yenisey. At the 2019 Winter Universiade the new indoor stadium hosted bandy matches.

References

Bandy venues in Russia
Sport in Krasnoyarsk